Bromborough is a town in the Metropolitan Borough of Wirral, Merseyside, England, and the historic county of Cheshire, on the Wirral Peninsula south east of Bebington and north of Eastham.

At the 2011 census, the population of the ward was 14,850.

History
The name Brunanburh  is suggested to mean "Bruna's fortification", with  burh being Old English for a fortified place.  Bromborough is a contender for the site of an epic battle of 937, the Battle of Brunanburh, which confirmed England as a united Anglo-Saxon kingdom. In an article in Notes and Queries in 2022, Michael Deakin questions the philological case for Bromborough as Brunanburh, suggesting that the first element in the name is 'brown' and not 'Bruna'. Bromborough would therefore be 'the brown [stone-built] manor or fort. Reconstructed from fragments, an Anglo Saxon cross is in the churchyard of local parish church St Barnabas. However, Bromborough is not specifically named in the Domesday Survey, and the name does not appear in records until the 12th century.

A charter for a market to be held each Monday was granted by Edward I in 1278 to the monks of St. Werburgh's Abbey. It was hoped that establishing the market in the vicinity of Bromborough Cross would promote honest dealing. The market cross was the traditional centre of the village and also an assembly point for local farm labourers available for hire. The steps of the cross are from the original 13th-century monument. The cross itself is a more recent reproduction, presented to the town by the Bromborough Society.

With a watermill having been recorded near Bromborough at the time of the Domesday Survey, Bromborough watermill was likely to have been the oldest mill site on the Wirral. Located on the River Dibbin at what is known as Spital Dam, it was worked until 1940 and demolished in 1949. The site is now a children's nursery. A windmill, built in 1777, existed on higher ground also at the same location. Having fallen into disuse and much deteriorated, it was destroyed by gunpowder in about 1878.

An increase in traffic passing through the area resulted in Bromborough undergoing extensive redevelopment in the 1930s. Bromborough Hall, built in 1617, was demolished in 1932 to make way for a by-pass and a number of farmhouses and cottages in the area of Bromborough Cross were replaced with shops.

Civic history
Bromborough was a township and parish in the Wirral Hundred, which became a civil parish in 1866. From 1894 Bromborough was also an urban district. Both the civil parish and the urban district were abolished in 1922 when it was merged with the neighbouring civil parish of Bebington, ultimately becoming part of the Municipal Borough of Bebington. Under local government reorganisation on 1 April 1974, Bromborough transferred from Cheshire to the newly-formed county of Merseyside.

Geography
Bromborough is situated on the eastern side of the Wirral Peninsula, at the western side of the River Mersey.

Governance
Bromborough is within the parliamentary constituency of Wirral South. The current Member of Parliament is Alison McGovern, a Labour representative.

At local government level, the town also a ward of the Metropolitan Borough of Wirral, in the metropolitan county of Merseyside. Bromborough is represented on Wirral Council by three councillors. 
The most recent local elections took place on 2 May 2019.

Landmarks

The partially medieval Bromborough Cross, in the old village centre, is a designated Grade II* listed building.
St Barnabas' Church, designed by George Gilbert Scott, is also Grade II* listed and was constructed in the 1860s to replace a smaller church.
Both Stanhope House and Pear Tree Cottage are Grade II listed and are amongst several buildings from the late seventeenth century that survive in the modern town.

Community

To the west of the A41 New Chester Road, Bromborough is mainly residential development started in the 1930s, centred on the original village centre with its market cross.

There are a number of pubs in Bromborough: 'The Bromborough,' the 'Royal Oak' and the local British Legion, now known as the Bromborough Social Club are situated in Bromborough Village. 'The Archers' pub had closed down by 2013 and planning permission was submitted for it to be demolished. On the outskirts, bordering Eastham, are the 'Merebrook' and the 'Dibbinsdale', where there is a branch of the Pesto restaurant chain.

Bromborough's green spaces include Brotherton Park and Dibbinsdale Local Nature Reserve, along the banks of the River Dibbin, and Marfords Park to the south west of the town.

The local newspapers are the Bromborough and Bebington News and the Wirral Globe.

Economy
East of the A41 road, towards the River Mersey, is industrial development and includes Bromborough Pool, an early industrial "model village" developed from 1853–58 by Price's Candles. Part of the industry is connected to the former Bromborough Dock and includes a ammonium nitrate warehouse and the main landfill site for the Wirral, now a walkway with views of the river. Cereal Partners employs 340 people and produces Cheerios and Corn Flakes, among other breakfast cereals, in a factory formerly owned by Viota. Rank Hovis McDougall briefly owned the business in the 1990s. Another major business is Sun Valley Snacks Ltd, which processes peanuts.

The Croft Retail & Leisure Park, which opened in March 1990, is located off the A41.

Transport

Road
The main road through the area is the A41 New Chester Road. The B5137 Spital Road joins the A41 at Bromborough.

Bus
There are many local bus services which serve the village, mostly operated by Stagecoach Merseyside. Stagecoach Gold service 1 offers direct, premium connections to Liverpool and Birkenhead to the north; Chester, Chester Zoo and Ellesmere Port to the south.

Rail
Bromborough and Bromborough Rake railway stations are both situated on the Wirral line of the Merseyrail network.

See also
Listed buildings in Bromborough
Listed buildings in Bromborough Pool
Bromborough power stations

References

Notes

Citations

Bibliography

External links
 Birkenhead & Surrounds

Towns and villages in the Metropolitan Borough of Wirral
Towns in Merseyside